Samuel M. Axford was a Michigan politician.

Early life
Axford lived in his youth in Oakland County.  He attended the University of Michigan for medical education.  In 1858, he moved from Detroit to Flint.   He built Axford House as a joint residence and hospital.

Political life
He was elected as the eleventh mayor of the Village of Flint in 1868 serving a single 1-year term.

Axford died in 1873.

References

Mayors of Flint, Michigan
University of Michigan Medical School alumni
1873 deaths
19th-century American politicians
Year of birth missing